Tito Trocchi (1 May 1864 – 12 February 1947) was an Italian prelate of the Catholic Church who worked in the diplomatic service of the Holy See. He became an archbishop in 1915 and led the papal representations in Cuba and Bolivia. He spent the last twenty years of his life working in the Roman Curia.

Biography
Tito Trocchi was born on 1 May 1864 in Rome. He was ordained a priest on 24 September 1887. 

On 14 November 1925, Pope Benedict XV appointed him Apostolic Delegate to Cuba and Puerto and on 9 December titular archbishop of Lacedaemon. He received his episcopal consecration on 12 December 1915 from Archbishop Vittorio Ranuzzi de' Bianchi.

On 25 May 1921, Pope Benedict appointed him Apostolic Internuncio to Bolivia.

On 11 January 1927, Pope Pius XI named him auditor general of the Apostolic Chamber. 

On 22 November 1939, named him Vice Camerlengo of the Holy Roman Church.

He died on 12 February 1947.

References

External links 
Catholic Hierarchy: Archbishop Tito Trocchi 

1864 births
1947 deaths
Clergy from Rome
Apostolic Nuncios to Cuba
Apostolic Nuncios to Bolivia
Diplomats from Rome